AZB may refer to:

 South Azerbaijani language (ISO 639:azb), also called Iranian Azerbaijani
 AZB & Partners, a law firm in India
Azb DMR MK1, a Pakistani semi-automatic Designated marksman rifle/sniper rifle